The Los Gatos Observer was an online source of news and information for Los Gatos, California and surrounding areas of the South Bay. It was formed by Alastair Dallas in May 2006.

The Los Gatos Observer served the 30,000 residents of Los Gatos and approximately 30,000 more in neighboring Monte Sereno, Chemeketa Park, Aldercroft Heights, Redwood Estates, and other so-called "mountain communities." The Observer contained news articles, event calendars, police reports, sports coverage, obituaries and local photographs.

References

American news websites